Pad or pads may refer to:

Wearables 
 Pads, protective equipment used in baseball, cricket, and hockey
 Elbow pad
 Knee pad
 Shoulder pads (sport)
 Menstrual pad, used to absorb menstrual or other vaginal blood
 Incontinence pad, worn to absorb involuntarily expelled bodily fluids 
 Shoulder pads (fashion), fabric-covered padding in clothing

Computing and electronics

Input devices
 Gamepad, joypad, or controller, an input device used in gaming
 Graphics pad, a computer input device
 Keypad, buttons arranged in a block
 Touchpad or trackpad, a pointing device featuring a tactile sensor
 Trigger pad, an electronic sensor on a drum

Other hardware
 Contact pad, the designated surface area for an electrical contact
 A resistive pad used in an attenuator
 An electronic notebook
 GRiDPad, known as first commercial tablet computer
 iPad, a tablet computer made by Apple
 ThinkPad, a laptop brand first designed and produced by IBM, but now owned by Lenovo
 WatchPad, discontinued IBM smartwatch line
 WorkPad, discontinued line of PDA, branded by IBM

Other uses in computing and electronics
 One-time pad, a method of cryptography

Transportation 
 Brake pad, part of a drum brake
 Launch pad, an area where spacecraft start flight
 Helicopter landing pad
 Roll way or running pad, placed along the rails of metro or tram tracks

Music
 Pad, some holes of woodwind instruments (clarinets, saxophones...) are closed by air-tight pads.
 Soft, mellow timbres generated by synthesisers are often called pads, and are generally used as backing sounds.

Other uses
 Part of a mammal's paw
 Pad, Roane County, West Virginia
 A paper notebook
 San Diego Padres, a Major League Baseball team nicknamed the "Pads"

See also

 PADS (disambiguation)
 PAD (disambiguation)
 PADD
 Padding (disambiguation)